Richard Halsey (born 1940) is an American film editor with more than 60 credits from 1970 onwards.  An alumnus of Hollywood High School, he won an Academy Award for Best Film Editing at the 49th Academy Awards for editing Rocky with Scott Conrad, also being nominated for one BAFTA and one Emmy Award. He often works with his wife Colleen Halsey and they are credited together.  Both have been elected to membership in American Cinema Editors (A.C.E.); Halsey has been a member since 1988. He is now living in the Hollywood Hills.

Selected filmography
 Fear of Rain (TBA)
 What About Love (2020)
 The Outsider (2019)
 Purge of Kingdoms: The Unauthorized Game of Thrones Parody (2019)
 DIVOS! (2019)
 Working Man (2019)
 The Little Mermaid (2018)
 Enchanted Christmas (2017) TV
 Limelight (2017)
 All Saints (2017)
 White Crows (2016)
 Loserville (2016)
 Spaceman (2016)
 Helicopter Mom (2014)
 Love by Design (2014)
 Road to the Open (2014)
 1000 to 1: The Cory Weissman Story (2014)
 The Ganzfeld Haunting (2014)
 Snake and Mongoose (2013)
 Max Rose (2013)
 Victims (2013)
 Christmas in Compton (2012)
 186 Dollars to Freedom (2012)
 The Girl from the Naked Eye (2012)
 Ticket Out (2012)
 Valley of the Sun (2011)
 The Chosen One (2010)
 The Chicago 8 (2010)
 Dreamkiller (2010)
 Don't Look Up (2009)
 Bring It On: Fight to the Finish (2009)
 Stiletto (2008)
 Spy School (2008)
 Big Stan (2007)
 Yellow (2006)
 When Do We Eat? (2005)
 Eulogy (2004)
 The Sure Hand of God (2004)
 Coast to Coast (2003) TV
 Sorority Boys (2002)
 Pumpkin (2002)
 Warden of Red Rock (2001) TV
 Kingdom Come (2001)
 Picnic (2000) TV
 The Wishing Tree (1999)
 Toy Story 2 (1999)
 Presence of Mind (1999)
 Pirates of Silicon Valley (1999) TV
 Barney's Great Adventure (1998)
 That Old Feeling (1997)
 Eddie (1996)
 Last of the Dogmen (1995)
 The Net (1995)
 Getting Even with Dad (1994)
 So I Married an Axe Murderer (1993)
 Sister Act (1992)
 Article 99 (1992)
 Edward Scissorhands (1990)
 Joe Versus the Volcano (1990)
 Beaches (1988)
 Earth Girls Are Easy (1988)
 Dragnet (1987)
 Mannequin (1987)
 Jocks (1986)
 Down and Out in Beverly Hills (1986)
 Heated Vengeance (1985)
 Body Rock (1984)
 Dreamscape (1984)
 Moscow on the Hudson (1984)
 Losin' It (1983)
 That Championship Season (1982)
 The Amateur (1981)
 Tribute (1980)
 American Gigolo (1980)
 Boulevard Nights (1979)
 Thank God It's Friday (1978)
 Fire Sale (1977)
 Rocky (1976)
 Next Stop, Greenwich Village (1976)
 Louis Armstrong - Chicago Style (1976) TV
 W.W. and the Dixie Dancekings (1975)
 Harry and Tonto (1974)
 When the Line Goes Through (1973)
 I Heard the Owl Call My Name (1973) TV
 Terror on the Beach (1973) TV
 Pat Garrett and Billy the Kid (1973)
 Honor Thy Father (1973) TV
 Firehouse (1973) TV
 Payday (1972)
 Moon of the Wolf (1972) TV
 No Drums, No Bugles (1972)
 Up in the Cellar (1970)

Awards and nominations
2005:
Nominated: ACE Best Edited Miniseries or Motion Picture for Non-Commercial Television - Coast to Coast
2000:
 Won: ACE Best Edited Motion Picture Movie for Commercial Television - Pirates of Silicon Valley

1999:
Nominated: Emmy Award for Outstanding Single Camera Picture Editing for a Miniseries or a Movie - Pirates of Silicon Valley
1978:
Nominated: BAFTA Award for Best Editing - Rocky
1977:
 Won: Academy Award for Best Film Editing - Rocky (shared with Scott Conrad)
 Won: ACE Best Edited Feature Film - Rocky (shared with Scott Conrad)

References

External links
 
 

American Cinema Editors
American film editors
Best Film Editing Academy Award winners
Living people
People from Los Angeles
1940 births